Healing is Todd Rundgren's ninth studio album, released in 1981. The album's themes are spirituality and the human condition, something Rundgren had touched on many times in earlier works but never with the consistency exhibited here as every track explores a different aspect. The back cover image of the album (artwork by Prairie Prince) shows the caduceus  and a Qabalistic Tree of Life each overlaid by a treble clef (Which is reversed for the Tree of Life), reflecting Rundgren's linking of his spirituality and music.

The original vinyl release includes a bonus 7" 33rpm single featuring the tracks "Time Heals" and "Tiny Demons" which are unlisted on the album sleeve but are included at the end of the later CD release as tracks 10 and 11.

"Time Heals" and "Compassion" were both released as singles and a promotional video was made for the former, which was the eighth music video to air on MTV during its launch on August 1, 1981.

Live performance
In September 2010, Rundgren performed his Todd and Healing albums live for the first time in Akron, Ohio, followed by concerts in Muskegon MI, Indianapolis IN, St. Louis MO, Glenside PA, and Morristown NJ. Whereas the original Healing album had been entirely performed by Rundgren in the studio, the live performances featured the same band as for the Todd shows:  Jesse Gress, Greg Hawkes, Prairie Prince, Bobby Strickland, and Kasim Sulton. Led by choirmaster Dirk Hillyer, local choirs from near each venue joined the band during parts of the Healing set. Large LED display and lasers were on display throughout the shows with Rundgren and the band dressed in extravagant costumes. The shows have been released on DVD.

Track listing
Side one
"Healer" - 3:40
"Pulse" - 3:07
"Flesh" - 3:58
"Golden Goose" - 3:16
"Compassion" - 4:43
"Shine" - 8:12

Side two
"Healing, Part I" - 7:28
"Healing, Part II" - 7:52
"Healing, Part III" - 4:40

Bonus 7-inch 33rpm Single
"Time Heals" - 3:33
"Tiny Demons" - 3:08

In some releases of the LP, "Time Heals" and "Tiny Demons" have been added to the end of the second side.

Personnel
Todd Rundgren - all vocals and instruments, producer, engineer
Technical
Bean - additional engineering
Prairie Prince - artwork

Charts
Album

Single

Formats
Vinyl LP 
Cassette
8 Track Tape
Compact Disc

References

Todd Rundgren albums
1981 albums
Albums produced by Todd Rundgren
Bearsville Records albums
Rhino Records albums